Tamara Radojević (née Georgijev) (born ; 6 September 1992) is a Serbian handball player for Kisvárdai KC and the Serbian national team.

She competed at the 2015 World Women's Handball Championship in Denmark.

Her sister is Kristina Graovac handball player.

References

External links

1992 births
Living people
Serbian female handball players
People from Pirot
Expatriate handball players in Turkey
Ardeşen GSK players
Serbian expatriate sportspeople in Hungary
Serbian expatriate sportspeople in Slovenia
Serbian expatriate sportspeople in Turkey
Universiade medalists in handball
Mediterranean Games medalists in handball
Mediterranean Games gold medalists for Serbia
Competitors at the 2013 Mediterranean Games
Universiade bronze medalists for Serbia